Events from the year 1937 in Taiwan.

Taiwan and Penghu,  Empire of Japan.
Kinmen and Mazu Islands, Republic of China.

Incumbents

Central government of Japan
 Prime Minister: Kōki Hirota, Senjūrō Hayashi, Fumimaro Konoe

Taiwan
 Governor-General – Seizō Kobayashi

Events
 December - the Ministry of Basic Industries(Republic of China) was reorganized as the Ministry of Economic Affairs.

Japan conquer Pratas Island.

Births
 19 June – Li Kuei-hsien, author and poet
 2 October – Liu Cheng-tao, cyclist

References

 
Years of the 20th century in Taiwan